Elisabeth Farnese (Italian: Elisabetta Farnese, Spanish: Isabel Farnesio; 25 October 169211 July 1766) was Queen of Spain by marriage to King Philip V. She was the de facto ruler of Spain from 1714 until 1746 since she managed the affairs of state with the approval of her spouse, and is particularly known for her great influence over Spain's foreign policy. From 1759 until 1760, she governed as regent.

Parma
Elisabeth was born at the Palazzo della Pilotta in Parma, the daughter of Odoardo Farnese and Dorothea Sophie of Neuburg. Her mother later married her uncle Francesco Farnese, Duke of Parma.

Elisabeth was raised in seclusion in an apartment in the Palace in Parma. She had a difficult relationship with her mother, but was reportedly deeply devoted to her uncle-stepfather. She could speak and write Latin, French, and German and was schooled in rhetoric, philosophy, geography and history, but, reportedly, she found no interest in her studies and lacked intellectual interests. She was a better student within dance, studied painting under Pietro Antonio Avanzini and enjoyed music and embroidery. She survived a virulent attack of smallpox.

Because of the lack of male heirs of her father, her uncle-stepfather, and her youngest uncle, who all succeeded one another, preparations were made for the succession of the Duchy of Parma through the female line (her). She consequently received many marriage proposals. Victor Amadeus, Prince of Piedmont and Francesco d'Este, Hereditary Prince of Modena both asked for her hand but negotiations eventually failed, as well as Prince Pio della Mirandola. The Duchy of Parma would later be inherited by her first son, Infante Carlos. After his accession to the Spanish throne, the title passed on to her third son, Infante Felipe. It was he who founded the modern day House of Bourbon-Parma.

Marriage
On 16 September 1714 she was married by proxy at Parma to Philip V of Spain. The marriage was arranged by the ambassador of Parma, Cardinal Alberoni, with the concurrence of the Princesse des Ursins, the Camarera mayor de Palacio of the King of Spain. She had stipulated to Philip that the marriage would not be consummated until she was decked with the jewels of her choosing. Her request delayed sailing of a fleet of 12 vessels commanded by Captain General Don Antonio de Echeverz y Zubiza and Captain Don Juan Esteban de Ubilla, which was already scheduled to bring the accumulated wealth of three years from the New World to Spain. On 30 July 1715, a hurricane struck the treasure fleet which led to 11 ships hitting the deadly reefs and sinking near present-day Vero Beach, Florida.

The marriage was arranged because of the sexual need of Philip V, as his religious scruples prevented him from having a sexual life outside of marriage and he had insisted upon his conjugal rights almost until the last days of his previous consort's life. Elisabeth was a natural choice for Philip V because of the traditional Spanish interests in Italian provinces, and she was the heir of the Parmesan throne. The Parmese ambassador convinced the all-powerful Princess des Ursins to give her crucial consent to the marriage by convincing her that Elisabeth was a simple-minded person, accustomed to nothing but needlework and embroidery and easy to control and dominate as a replacement for the previous, cooperative queen consort. In parallel, Alberoni informed Elisabeth that the king "wishes to be governed" by others and that she would be an unhappy queen unless she swiftly took control, and that she would also be liked by the Spaniards if she removed the influence of the French party headed by the princess des Ursins.

Elisabeth left Parma in September and traveled to Spain by land in a retinue led by Marquis Schotta and Ippolita Ludovisi, Princess de Piombino. Originally intended to travel by sea, she became ill in Genova, and the plans were therefore altered. On her way to Spain, she met the Prince of Monaco and the French ambassador, who forwarded her gifts from the King of France. Elisabeth spent several days in Bayonne in November as guest of her maternal aunt, the Queen Dowager Maria Anna of Spain. At the Franco-Spanish border, she was met by Alberoni, who spent several days warning her against des Ursins. Upon entrance to Spain, she refused to part with her Italian retinue in exchange for a Spanish one, as had originally been planned.

On 23 December at Jadraque, Elisabeth met the Princesse des Ursins, who as her newly appointed Mistress of the Robes wished to present herself before Elisabeth met Philip V at Guadalajara. The princess had sent out spies who reported that Elisabeth was in fact not at all a timid person who would be easy to control. Elisabeth received des Ursins and asked to speak with her privately. Shortly after, the party could hear the sounds of a violent argument, after which des Ursins was arrested, fired, and immediately escorted over the border to France. There have been many different versions of this incident, and different suggestions as to how it occurred. Alberoni informed the king that Elisabeth had acted with his best interests at hand, and when Philip met Elisabeth at Guadalajara 24 December, he quickly fell in love with her at first sight, just as he had with his former spouse.

Queen of Spain

Elisabeth enjoyed hunting and wore male riding attire while doing so. She was described as an excellent shot and rider, and often hunted with the king. Early on, she became overweight because of her great appetite. She spent extravagantly, on both herself and her confidants. Her circle of confidants consisted, except her nurse Laura Pescatori, of her Italian doctor Cervi and Marquis Scotti, who were also a part of her Italian retinue. Her favorites among her ladies-in-waiting was first her Flemish attendant La Pellegrina, who acted as the go-between for her and minister Patino, and the Duchess of Saint-Pierre; after the former had married and the latter departed for France in 1727, she favored the Marchioness Las Nieves, who had the task to act as the queen's informant and who by 1736 was said to be the one who should be courted for supplicants to the queen. She respected her chief lady-in-waiting, Countess de Altamira, who managed her ladies-in-waiting very strictly.

Initially, Queen Elisabeth was popular because her dismissal of des Ursins made her seem as the savior of Spain from French dominance, but her complete dominance of the monarch soon made her as unpopular as des Ursins. Elisabeth was also unpopular among the Spanish nobility for the decline of formal Spanish etiquette court life, and pamphlets of the "Spanish party" typically accused her of keeping the king in slavery, benefiting foreigners and trying to murder her step-sons.

Political influence
With the advice of Alberoni and cardinal del Giudice, Elisabeth became the confidante of Philip and proceed to eliminate the French party at court and replacing it with her own followers through a network of clients and supporters, created with the help of among others her Italian nurse Laura Pescatori. Her chief adviser was Alberoni, who guided her as how to protect the interests of herself and Parma, while he himself, as a foreigner, had only her to rely on for his power.

Queen Elisabeth quickly obtained complete influence over Philip, who himself wished to be dominated. Reportedly she had physical charm and purposefulness, she was intelligent and could converse, be happy, jovial and charming, but also ambitions for glory, approval and popularity. According to the French ambassador the Duke of Saint-Aignan, she got the king to believe that what she willed was what he wanted, and she shared his tastes and eccentricities; he was also strongly sexually dependent on her, because of his scruples against sex outside of marriage. The bipolar depressions of Philip V periodically left him paralyzed and unable to handle government affairs, during which she handled them: such periods occurred in 1717, 1722, 1728, 1731, 1732–33 and 1737. 
    
In contrast to what was normal for a Spanish monarch, Philip preferred to share the queen's apartments rather than to have his own separate ones, and it was in the queen's apartments he met with his ministers.     Elisabeth was thereby present at all government meetings from the start, and while she initially sat by the side embroidering, she soon participated more and more and eventually speaking for her spouse while he sat quiet. The king did not live in his own apartments but in the queen's, where he spent the whole night.     When he awoke, he discussed the government business with the queen, after which the couple, still in their dressing gowns, conferred with their ministers in the queen's bedroom while the government business was spread over the queen's bed by her ladies-in-waiting. From 1729, they seldom emerged from the queen's quarter before two in the afternoon, after which they very swiftly performed their official functions.      Philip did not like ceremonial court life or representation at all, and preferred to live in the smaller hunting palaces such as Pardo or Aranjuez, where ceremonial court life could not properly occur, than in Madrid, and their absence from physical presence in court life and public visibility became so marked that they were criticized for it, especially Elisabeth. After the dismissal of Alberoni in 1719 she was effectively the sole ruler in Spain.

In 1724, entreaties failed to prevent the abdication of Philip, who gave up the throne in favour of his firstborn (Louis I) heir from his first marriage.   Phillip then retired to the palace of La Granja.    Also in 1724, she acquired the San Ildefonso Group for him from the Odescalchi family.    During the reign of Louis, however, Elisabeth kept her hold of power. Seven months later, however, the death of the young king recalled Philip to the throne. It was Elisabeth who, with the aide of the ministers, the papal nuncio, theologians and all her net of contacts pressured him to retake the crown.

Foreign policy
Queen Elisabeth was uninterested in domestic policy and preferred foreign policy, where her goal was to enforce the Spanish presence in the Italian states, combined with her ambition for her own sons, who were initially not expected to succeed in Spain because of the existence of her step-sons.   Elisabeth's influence was exerted altogether in support of Alberoni's policy, one chief aim of which was to recover the ancient Italian possessions of Spain, and which actually resulted in the seizure of Sardinia and Sicily.    So vigorously did she enter into this policy that when the French forces advanced to the Pyrenees, she placed herself at the head of one division of the Spanish army.        In April 1719, the queen accompanied the king on his campaign to the front upon the French invasion; dressed in a habit of blue and silver, she continuously reviewed and encouraged her troops on horseback.

Her ambition, however, was grievously disappointed. The Triple Alliance thwarted her plans when British troops raided Vigo, and by 1720 the allies made the banishment of Alberoni a condition of peace. Sicily also had to be evacuated.

During the later years of Philip V, when he was nearly senile, Elisabeth directed the whole policy of Spain so as to secure thrones in Italy for her sons.    In 1731 she had the satisfaction of seeing her favored scheme realized with the recognition by the powers in the Treaty of Vienna of her son Don Carlos (afterwards Charles III of Spain) as the Duke of Parma, and after the 1738 Treaty of Vienna his accession to the throne of the Two Sicilies.    Her second son, Philip, became Duke of Parma in 1748.

Queen Dowager
On 9 July 1746, the reign of Elisabeth ended with the death of Philip V and the succession of her stepson Ferdinand. As Ferdinand, like his father, left the government business to his spouse, Maria Barbara, the French ambassador remarked that: "it is rather Barbara who succeeds Elisabeth than Ferdinand succeeding Philip."

As queen dowager, Elisabeth initially did not agree to surrender the reins of power.    She settled with a court of supporters in a rented mansion in Madrid, and demanded to be kept informed of government policy and openly criticized the new monarchs. By mid 1747, Queen Barbara was encouraged to deal with her by Portugal and José de Carvajal y Lancáster, and on 23 July 1747, Elisabeth was exiled with her court to the palace of La Granja, where she spent the rest of her step-son's reign exiled from the royal court and any influence on politics. She hosted grand receptions where she welcomed foreign diplomats and encouraged the criticism of the opposition toward her step-son.

The last time Elisabeth Farnese was involved in politics was after the death of her step-son Ferdinand VI in 1759.   After his death, the Spanish throne went to her own son, then absent as the king of Naples.   Elisabeth was then made interim regent of Spain from the death of Ferdinand VI in 1759 until the arrival of her son Charles III in 1760.

In the time between her husband's death in 1746 and her own in 1766, she witnessed many events: the accession to the Spanish throne of her stepson, Ferdinand VI and Barbara of Portugal, whom she hated; and the accession to the throne of Parma of her beloved second son, Philip. In 1752 she built Riofrio Palace as her dowager residence.

She later spent much of her time at the palaces of La Granja and Aranjuez. It was there that she died in 1766 at the age of 73. She was buried next to her husband in the Colegiata of San Ildefonso.

Issue
Charles III of Spain (20 January 171614 December 1788), spouse of Maria Amalia of Saxony.
Mariana Victoria (31 March 171815 January 1781), Queen of Portugal by marriage to King Joseph. 
Philip (15 March 172018 July 1765), Duke of Parma and founder of the line of House of Bourbon-Parma, spouse of Louise Élisabeth of France.
Maria Theresa Rafaela (11 June 172622 July 1746), spouse of Louis, Dauphin of France.
Luis (25 July 17277 August 1785), known as the Cardinal-Infante. Was Archbishop of Toledo, Primate of Spain and cardinal since 1735. In 1754, renounced his ecclesiastical titles and became Count of Chinchón. In 1776, he married morganatically María Teresa de Vallabriga and had issue, but without royal titles.
Maria Antonietta Ferdinanda (17 November 172919 September 1785), spouse of Victor Amadeus III of Sardinia.

Ancestry

References

Sources

 Petrie, Charles: King Charles III of Spain New York, John Day Company, 1971
 Harcourt-Smith, Simon: Cardinal of Spain: the Life and Strange Career of Giulio Alberoni New York, Knopf, 1955
 Mémoires pour servir à l'histoire d'Espagne sous le régne de Philippe V by the Marquis de St Philippe, translated by Maudave (Paris, 1756)
 Memoirs of Elizabeth Farnese (London, 1746)
 The Spanish original of the Comentarios del marqués de San Felipe was published in the Biblioteca de Autores Españoles

External links

1692 births
1766 deaths
Elizabeth
Elisabeth
Elisabeth
Spanish royal consorts
Queen mothers
Regents of Spain
Nobility from Parma
18th-century women rulers
18th-century Italian women
18th-century Spanish women